The Sturgeon River is a river in the Hudson Bay drainage basin in Manitoba and Ontario, Canada. It flows west from its source in Unorganized Kenora District, Northwestern Ontario, through Sturgeon Lake, and takes in the right tributary Hayhurst River just before reaching its mouth at the Echoing River in Northern Region, Manitoba. The Echoing River flows via the Gods River and the Hayes River to Hudson Bay.

See also
List of rivers of Manitoba
List of rivers of Ontario

References

Rivers of Northern Manitoba
Rivers of Kenora District
Hudson's Bay Company trading posts
Tributaries of Hudson Bay